The men's individual archery event at the 1972 Summer Olympics was part of the archery programme. The event consisted of a double FITA round. For each round, the archer shot 36 arrows at each of four distances—90, 50, 70, and 30 metres. The highest score for each arrow was 10 points, giving a possible maximum of 2880 points.

Records

The following new Olympic records were set during this competition.

Results

Notes
 Jacobsen defeated Telford 76-70 in a tie-breaker to gain 8th place.
 Jones defeated Hibino 61-46 in a tie-breaker to gain 28th place.
 Akkerhaugen defeated Naranjilla 286-285 in a tie-breaker to gain 36th place.

References

External links
Official Olympic Report

M
Men's events at the 1972 Summer Olympics